Mezre may refer to:

 Məzrə (disambiguation), places in Azerbaijan
 Mezre, Iran (disambiguation), places in Iran
 Mezre, a former name of Elazığ, Turkey